Ludwig of Bavaria or Louis of Bavaria may refer to:

Dukes
Louis I, Duke of Bavaria (1173–1231), Duke of Bavaria in 1183 and the Count of Palatinate of the Rhine in 1214. He was a son of Otto I
Louis II, Duke of Bavaria (1229–1294), Duke of Bavaria from 1253 and Count Palatine of the Rhine. 
Louis III, Duke of Bavaria, Duke of Lower Bavaria 1290–1296
Louis IV, Holy Roman Emperor, also known as "Ludwig the Bavarian", (1282–1347) was Duke of Bavaria from 1294 to 1301 together with his brother Rudolf I; Count of the Palatinate until 1329; and German king from 1314. He was crowned as Holy Roman Emperor in 1328
Louis V, Duke of Bavaria (1315–1361), also called "the Brandenburger", Duke of Bavaria, Margrave of Brandenburg and Count of Tyrol
Louis VI the Roman (1328–1365), the second son of the Emperor Louis IV.  Duke of Bavaria 1347–1365; Margrave of Brandenburg 1351–1365; elector (Kurfürst) of Brandenburg in 1356
Louis VII, Duke of Bavaria (1365–1447), Duke of Bavaria-Ingolstadt. He was a son of Stephen III
Louis VIII, Duke of Bavaria (1403–1445), Duke of Bavaria-Ingolstadt from 1443
Louis IX, Duke of Bavaria (1417–1479), Duke of Bavaria-Landshut from 1450. He was a son of Henry XVI the Rich and Margarete of Austria
Louis X, Duke of Bavaria (1495–1545), Duke of Bavaria (1516–1545), together with his older brother William IV, Duke of Bavaria. His parents were Albert IV and Kunigunde of Austria, a daughter of Emperor Frederick III

Kings
Ludwig I of Bavaria (1786–1868) was King of Bavaria from 1825 until the 1848 revolutions in the German states
Ludwig II of Bavaria (1845–1886), sometimes known as "Mad King Ludwig" and in German as the Märchenkönig (Fairy-tale King), was King of Bavaria from 1864 until his death
Ludwig III of Bavaria (1845–1921) was the last King of Bavaria from 1913 to 1918

Others
 Prince Ludwig of Bavaria (1913–2008), son of Prince Franz of Bavaria and a grandson of King Ludwig III
Prince Ludwig of Bavaria (b.1982), eldest son of Prince Luitpold of Bavaria.  He is  a great-great-grandson of the last King of Bavaria Ludwig III